No Geography is the ninth studio album by English electronic music duo The Chemical Brothers, released on 12 April 2019 by Virgin EMI Records in the United Kingdom and by Astralwerks in the United States. It is the duo's first album in four years. The album features vocals by Aurora and Japanese rapper Nene. The album won the Grammy Award for Best Electronic/Dance Album at the 62nd Annual Grammy Awards.

Background
The album's name was announced in November 2018. The album takes its name from a line in the poem Geography by the New York poet Michael Brownstein, whose reading of it is sampled on the title track.

The album's cover is an image taken from the booklet of the 1977 album Consequences by Godley & Creme. The artwork is that of a motorway or autobahn from the point of view of the rear of an early British Chieftain main battle tank turret; looking out over the gun, behind the commander of the tank, toward the empty highway ahead. The 'cloud face' on the cover of 'Consequences' is visible in the sky.

Promotion
The first single, "Free Yourself", was released on 28 September 2018, with "MAH" (Mad as Hell) following on 7 January 2019. Music videos were filmed for both songs. On 1 February they released the third single, "Got to Keep On", accompanied by a music video directed by Michel Gondry. It since served as a theme tune for the BBC's television coverage of Glastonbury. On 8 March, The Chemical Brothers released the fourth single, "We've Got to Try", accompanied by a music video.

To support the album, the duo embarked on North American tour dates in May 2019, followed by European and Australian concerts later in 2019.

Critical reception

On the review aggregator Metacritic, which assigns a weighted mean rating out of 100 to reviews from mainstream critics, No Geography gained an average score of 79, indicating "generally positive reviews", based on 20 reviews. Thomas Smith of NME said the album is "another leap forward" for the Chemical Brothers. Luke Pearson of Exclaim! expressed a lack of enthusiasm for the album's second half, yet ultimately left a positive review, stating "even b-tier work from the Chemical Brothers is worthy of interest". Pitchfork stated the album blended "psychedelic sensory overload with riotous club bangers" and said "the shape-shifting electronic duo’s ninth album is their most entertaining in years."

Year-end rankings

Track listing

Adapted from No Geography liner notes:
 "Eve of Destruction" incorporates a sample of "Weekend" by Class Action
 "Got to Keep On" incorporates an interpolation of "Dance with Me" by Peter Brown
 "We've Got to Try" incorporates a sample of "I've Got to Find a Way" by The Halleluiah Chorus
 "Free Yourself" incorporates a sample of "Revolutionary Letter 49" by Diane di Prima
 "MAH" incorporates a sample of "I'm Mad as Hell" by El Coco
 "Catch Me I'm Falling" incorporates samples of "Bears on My Trail" by Snowbird and "A Letter from Vietnam" by Emanuel Laskey

Charts

References

2019 albums
The Chemical Brothers albums
Astralwerks albums
Virgin EMI Records albums
Grammy Award for Best Dance/Electronica Album